Edward Bradley (April 1808 – August 5, 1847) was a U.S. Representative from the state of Michigan.

Bradley was born in East Bloomfield, New York, and attended the common schools and the local academy in Canandaigua. He was associate judge of the common pleas court of Ontario County in 1836. He moved to Detroit, Michigan, in 1839 where he studied law and was admitted to the bar in 1841. He commenced practice in Marshall and became prosecuting attorney of Calhoun County in 1842. He was a member of the Michigan State Senate in 1842 and 1843 and developed a reputation as a gifted orator and stump speaker.

He was elected as a Democrat to the United States House of Representatives for the Thirtieth Congress, serving from March 4, 1847, until his death in New York City while en route to Washington, D.C., before the assembling of Congress. He was interred in the Congressional Cemetery in Washington, D.C.

See also
List of United States Congress members who died in office (1790–1899)

References
Early history of Michigan, with biographies of state officers, members of Congress, judges and legislators.  Bingham, S. D. (Stephen D.) Lansing, Thorp & Godfrey, state printers, 1888. p. 116-117
Calhoun County business directory for 1869-70. Battle Creek, Mich:E. G. Rust, 1869. p. 41-42

The Political Graveyard

1808 births
1847 deaths
Democratic Party Michigan state senators
Politicians from Detroit
Democratic Party members of the United States House of Representatives from Michigan
Politicians from New York City
Burials at the Congressional Cemetery
People from East Bloomfield, New York
19th-century American politicians